Georgi Valeryevich Nurov (born 8 June 1992) is a Russian former football forward.

Club career
He made his debut in the Russian Premier League for FC Lokomotiv Moscow on 6 November 2011 in a game against PFC CSKA Moscow.

In February 2017, he joined a third-tier Belgian club Patro Eisden.

References

External links
 

1992 births
Living people
Footballers from Moscow
Russia youth international footballers
Russia under-21 international footballers
Russian footballers
FC Lokomotiv Moscow players
Russian Premier League players
FC Rubin Kazan players
FC Ural Yekaterinburg players
FC Baltika Kaliningrad players
FC Tom Tomsk players
K. Patro Eisden Maasmechelen players
FC Urozhay Krasnodar players
Russian expatriate footballers
Expatriate footballers in Belgium
Association football forwards
FC Neftekhimik Nizhnekamsk players
FC Veles Moscow players